Bulgarian names in cosmos

Venus 
 Budevska crater
 Zdravka crater

Mars 
 Byala crater
 Dulovo (crater)

Asteroids 
 2575 Bulgaria
 4364 Shkodrov
 11856 Nicolabonev
 225232 Kircheva

253 Mathilde 
 Maritsa crater

External links 
 
 Българските имена в Космоса

Space program of Bulgaria
Astronomical nomenclature by nation